The Dolmabahçe–Bomonti Tunnel is a twin-tube road tunnel under the inner city of Istanbul, Turkey connecting the neighborhood of Dolmabahçe in Beşiktaş district and Bomonti in Şişli district.

The tunnel is part of a project of the Istanbul Metropolitan Municipality to build seven tunnels for the "City of Seven Hills", which is the nickname of Istanbul. It was opened on 14 June 2010 as the second tunnel of this project following the Kağıthane-Piyalepaşa Tunnel after a construction time of three years. Its southeast entry is situated north of the BJK İnönü Stadium in Dolmabahçe. It runs under the neighborhoods Taksim and Feriköy. The northwest entry is located in Bomonti.

References

Road tunnels in Turkey
Buildings and structures in Istanbul
Tunnels completed in 2010
Beşiktaş
Şişli
Tunnels in Istanbul